The floorball competition at the 2022 World Games took place in July 2022, in Birmingham, United States, at the BJCC East Exhibition Hall.
Originally scheduled to take place in July 2021, the Games were rescheduled for July 2022 as a result of the 2020 Summer Olympics postponement due to the COVID-19 pandemic.

Qualification

Qualification for the floorball event of the 2022 World Games was determined through the 2020 Men's World Floorball Championships. The United States as host qualified automatically. The top five finishing teams at the 2020 World Championships as well as the best finishing team from the Americas and Asia Oceania qualified for the World Games. However the qualified Asia-Oceania team had to be confirmed by the IFF Central Board and General Assembly since qualification for Asia Oceania teams for the World Championship was not held.

Qualified teams

Medal table

Medallists

Results

Preliminary round
All times are local (UTC–5).

Group A

Group B

Final round

Bracket

Semifinals

Seventh place game

Fifth place game

Bronze medal game

Gold medal game

Final ranking

References

External links
 The World Games 2022
 International Floorball Federation
 Results book

2022 World Games
2022
World Games